Willem Van der Tanerijen (died 1499) was a jurist in the Duchy of Brabant (the territory of which is now divided between the Netherlands and Belgium) whose manuscript treatise on the procedures of the major courts of the duchy is an important source for the legal history of the fifteenth century. He was also a proponent of university training in law.

Life
Sources on Van der Tanerijen's life are scarce. He was probably born in Antwerp, where he later served as an alderman. He was appointed to the Council of Brabant and later as master of requests of the Great Council of Mary of Burgundy.

Writings
 Boeck van der loopender practijken der raidtcameren van Brabant, edited by E. I. Strubbe, 2 vols. (Brussels, Commission royale pour la publication des anciennes lois et ordonnances de la Belgique, 1952).

References

1499 deaths
Legal history of Belgium
Legal history of the Netherlands
People from the Duchy of Brabant
Lawyers of the Habsburg Netherlands
15th-century people of the Holy Roman Empire
15th-century lawyers